is an anime adaptation based upon the visual novel of the same name. 

At the conclusion of an October 2019 live event, âge presented the on-screen title “Muv-Luv Alternative in Animation”, followed by a clip of new animation, seemingly indicating an anime adaptation of the original Muv-Luv Alternative visual novel. It was later announced that the new anime would be a television series. The series is animated by Yumeta Company and Graphinica, with production by Flagship Line, and is directed by Yukio Nishimoto, featuring Tatsuhiko Urahata handling the series' scripts, Takuya Tani designing the characters, and Evan Call composing the series' music. It aired from October 7 to December 23, 2021 on Fuji TV's +Ultra programming block.  V.W.P performed the series' opening theme song , while STEREO DIVE FOUNDATION performed the series' ending theme song "Tristar". Crunchyroll licensed the series outside of Asia. Muse Communication licensed the series in South and Southeast Asia.

At the end of the series' episode finale, a second season was announced. It aired from October 6 to December 22, 2022. JAM Project and Minami Kuribayashi performed the opening theme song , while V.W.P performed the ending theme song .

Episode list

Season 1

Season 2

Notes

References

Muv-Luv Alternative